Fabrice-Alan Do Marcolino (born 19 March 2002) is a Gabonese professional footballer who plays as a forward for Rennes B.

Early life 
Born in Libreville, Gabon, Alan Do Marcolino is the son of Gabonese international Fabrice Do Marcolino.

Club career 
Alan Do Marcolino joined the Stade Rennais academy from Laval in 2015, signing his first professional contract with the club from Rennes in April 2022.

International career 
Alan Do Marcolino made his international debut for Gabon on the 5 June 2022.

References

External links
 
 

2002 births
Living people
Sportspeople from Libreville
Gabonese footballers
Gabon international footballers
Association football forwards